TNG may refer to:

Entertainment
 Star Trek: The Next Generation, an American science fiction television series and part of the Star Trek franchise
 Degrassi: The Next Generation,  a Canadian teen drama television series set in the Degrassi universe
 The Newlywed Game, an American television game show
 Speed Racer: The Next Generation, an American animated television series based on the classic Japanese Speed Racer franchise

Politics and geography
 Tangier Ibn Battouta Airport (IATA code: TNG), an airport serving Tangier
 Territory of New Guinea, a League of Nations Trust Territory in New Guinea from 1920 to 1949
 Thanggam LRT station (LRT station abbreviation: TNG), a Light Rail Transit station in Sengkang, Singapore
 Transitional National Government, interim government of Somalia from 2000–2004
 Trans–New Guinea languages, an extensive family of Papuan languages spoken in New Guinea and neighboring islands

Science and Technology
 Samba TNG, a fork of the Samba networking protocol
 Telescopio Nazionale Galileo, a 3.58m Italian telescope located on the island of San Miguel de La Palma
 The Next Generation of Genealogy Sitebuilding, a genealogy software
 Nitroglycerin, also known as trinitroglycerin

Commerce
 TN'G, a motor scooter brand of CMSI
 Touch 'n Go, smart card used by Malaysian toll expressway and highway operators

See also 
 T&G (disambiguation)